Tamatem Games is a Jordan-based mobile game developer and publisher that partners with various international game developers to localise and bring international mobile games to the Arabic-speaking world. Since 2013, Tamatem has published more than 50 games, most notably: VIP Baloot, VIP Jalsat, Fashion Queen, and Clash of Empire. They have over 150 million downloads across their portfolio and 3.5 million daily active users on its top games, based on published performance reports.

History

Background 
Tamatem Games was founded by Hussam Hammo in 2013 after realising that there was a lack of Arabic games available online in the Arabic-speaking world.  Tamatem received its first acceleration opportunity from 500 Startups, a U.S accelerator and incubator in Silicon Valley, California in April 2013. 

Tamatem also took part in a three-month growth hacking program at WeWork where it signed its first publishing deal with Tapinator to localise and bring its games to the Middle Eastern and Northern African markets. In 2013, Tamatem lead its first round of seed investments that gave it $350,000 from MENA Venture Investments and 500 Startups. Following its seed round, Tamatem also secured a second round of funds in 2015 that came in from Kuwaiti-based fund Arzan VC. 

Milestones

"Awad the Delivery King", was a racing game produced in collaboration with Jordanian animation studio Kharabeesh and was published in 2014. It has been downloaded over 1 million times in less than a year. This helped the company hit its 6 million downloads mark.

By 2015, Tamatem had a 35-game portfolio running on both Android and iOS devices. It became a large company in the MENA region’s gaming sector with 40,000 downloads per day, receiving investments from both regional and international investors. ‘A Dumb Question’, one of Tamatem’s games released in 2015 and became the number 1 downloaded app in Saudi Arabia four days after its release.  

In 2016, Tamatem had 16 million total downloads and 41 published games, half of which reached No.1 on the iOS App Store and Google Play store. The portfolio of games had more than 2.1 million active users monthly and 350,000 active users daily. The company was experiencing a 40% month-over-month growth in downloads and revenue. By the end of 2017, Tamatem games reached 40 million downloads for a total of 50 published games.

In 2018, Tamatem raised a Series A investment round of $2.5 million. The round was led by Wamda Capital with participation from Discovery Nusantara Capital, Raed Ventures, Vision Ventures, and Seed Equity Venture Partners. 2018 was also the year that Tamatem signed with Lithuanian-based mobile game developers Game Insight to publish and localize Airport City in the Arabic-speaking market.

In 2020, Tamatem continued its Series A investment round, raising another $3.5 million also led by Wamda Capital along with Modern Electronics Company and North Base Media.  In the same year, Tamatem also partnered with Croatian video game developer Nanobit to publish and launch the mobile game Hollywood Story in the Arabic-speaking market. In 2020, Tamatem doubled in size and expanded from 35 to 70 employees in the span of 6 months.

In 2021, PUBG creators Krafton led Tamatem’s Series B investment round, which closed at $11 million. The round — which saw participation from Venture Souq, Endeavor Catalyst, and other existing investors — brought Tamatem’s total amount of funding to over $17 million since its inception.

In 2022, Tamatem announced a partnership with MSA Novo and its entrance and expansion into the Chinese mobile games market.

Business Model

Tamatem’s business model is based on a split-revenue partnership. Tamatem partners with game developers from around the world to publish their games in the Arab region. Revenue is split based on an agreement between Tamatem and the developer. Tamatem has published games in the Arab region from developers in the United States, Brazil, India, China, Indonesia, Bulgaria, and Croatia.

List of games

Awards

References

External links

Entertainment companies of Jordan
Video game companies established in 2013
Video game development companies